West Point is a village in Hancock County, Illinois, United States. The population was 178 at the 2010 census.

Geography

Demographics

As of the census of 2000, there were 195 people, 71 households, and 52 families residing in the village. The racial makeup of the village was 99.49% White, and 0.51% from two or more races.

There were 71 households, out of which 39.4% had children under the age of 18 living with them, 52.1% were married couples living together, 16.9% had a female householder with no husband present, and 25.4% were non-families. 23.9% of all households were made up of individuals, and 12.7% had someone living alone who was 65 years of age or older.  The average household size was 2.75 and the average family size was 3.09.

In the village, the population was spread out, with 30.3% under the age of 18, 6.7% from 18 to 24, 31.8% from 25 to 44, 20.5% from 45 to 64, and 10.8% who were 65 years of age or older.  The median age was 34 years. For every 100 females, there were 103.1 males.  For every 100 females age 18 and over, there were 91.5 males.

The median income for a household in the village was $29,500, and the median income for a family was $45,250. Males had a median income of $29,219 versus $23,472 for females. The per capita income for the village was $13,631.  About 15.6% of families and 16.3% of the population were below the poverty line, including 25.5% of those under the age of eighteen and 23.8% of those 65 or over.

References

Villages in Hancock County, Illinois
Villages in Illinois